Sidney Sussex Boat Club (often referred to as just Sidney or SSBC) is the rowing club for members of Sidney Sussex College, Cambridge, in England.

History
Founded in 1837, the club has spent most of its time in the 2nd division of the Lent and May Bumps, with brief times spent in the 1st division. Being a small college, the club has never had the consistency to rise to take a headship of either event, and has been as high as 6th in the Lent Bumps in 1913, and 11th in the May Bumps in 1923.

A women's crew first appeared in 1978 and has spent most of its time in the lower half of the 1st division in both the Lent and May Bumps, but recently has fallen to the middle of the 2nd division of both the Lent Bumps and the May Bumps.

2000 - 2010 
In its recent history, the Men's 1st VIII has fallen, and now resides in the lower half of the 2nd division in the Lent bumps, and the top of the 3rd division in Mays. The last major successes enjoyed by a Sidney men's crew in the May bumps were in the 2002, 2014, and 2017 May Bumps. In 2002 the 3rd Men's VIII, racing in the fifth division, won blades by bumping up every day. The crew became well-known on the river during the four days of competition due to their decision to race whilst wearing large, curly mullet wigs (and were known within the Boat Club as 'The Mullets').

2008 was a very successful year for Sidney's 2nd Women's VIII, winning their blades in both sets of Bumps races and the 'Fastest Women's 2nd VIII' prize in the Fairbairn Cup. Meanwhile, 2009 was a successful year for the whole boat club, and for the women in particular. The Women's 1st VIII won blades in the Lent Bumps, whilst in the May Bumps, five out of seven Sidney boats rose in the rankings, and not a single Sidney crew finished lower than they had started. In particular the Sidney 3rd Women's VIII - by virtue of three bumps, an overbump (taking place from sandwich boat position on the same day as bumping up) and a double overbump - climbed eleven places, giving them in the curious honour of overtaking Sidney 2nd Women's VIII, who themselves had risen three places.

2011 - 

In May Bumps, Sidney saw success most recently in 2014, and in 2017. In 2017, the 1st Men's VIII, racing in the second division - having only just returned from the third division a year earlier - won their oars by bumping up each day. Sidney caught Pembroke II on day one, Clare II on day two, Darwin on day three, and First and Third Trinity II on the final day. By winning their blades for the first time in many years, Sidney Sussex not only surpassed crews which had become longstanding rivals (Clare II in particular), but also rose above a fellow first boat for the first time in many years. Whereas previously only the Clare Hall and the Anglia Ruskin University first boats lay below them, Darwin now joined their ranks.

2014, the 2nd Men's VIII, racing in the fifth division - starting in third place on day one - won blades despite rowing over on the first day. This was done by bumping up on the second day, then on the third day rising four positions, bumping up into first place in the fifth division, then rowing again as sandwich boat in the fourth division, where they overbumped Trinity First and Third IV. On the fourth day, Sidney bumped up again, securing their blades.

Meanwhile in Lent Bumps, the last significant successes were in 2010, when the Men's 1st VIII won blades, and most recently in the 2016 Lent Bumps, where the 2nd Men's VIII won blades.

Lord Protector Boat Club 
The Lord Protector Boat Club (LPBC) is the Alumni section of SSBC. Members of Sidney Sussex, once they have left Cambridge, become members of LPBC. The event most regularly entered by LPBC is the Fairbairn cup, held by Jesus College Boat Club annually in December.

Boathouse
The boathouse with changing facilities was built (1958) to a design by David Roberts and extended in 1980s. It was listed as Grade II in 1997.

References

External links
Sidney Sussex Boat Club
Cambridge University Combined Boat Clubs

Rowing clubs of the University of Cambridge
Boat
Sports clubs established in 1837
1837 establishments in England
Rowing clubs in Cambridgeshire
Rowing clubs in England
Rowing clubs of the River Cam